Charles Locke may refer to:

Charles Holland Locke, Canadian judge
Charles Herbert Locke, Australian company director
Charles O. Locke (1896–1977), author of The Hell Bent Kid and other works

See also
Charlie Locke, owner of Lake Louise Mountain Resort
Charles Lock, British consul-general in Naples and Egypt